William Phelps may refer to:

Bill Phelps (1934–2019), Lieutenant Governor of Missouri
William Phelps (colonist) (1599–1672), one of the founders of Windsor, Connecticut
William Phelps (priest) (1797–1867), Church of England cleric
William E. Phelps (1835–?), American politician from Illinois
William F. Phelps (1822–1907), educational pioneer and author
William H. Phelps Sr. (1875–1965), American ornithologist and businessman.
William H. Phelps Jr. (1902–1988), Venezuelan ornithologist and businessman.
William J. Phelps (1808–1883), Illinois legislator
William Lyon Phelps (1865–1943), American author and critic
William Preston Phelps (1848–1917), American landscape painter
William Wallace Phelps (1826–1873), United States Representative from Minnesota
William Walter Phelps (1839–1894), United States Representative from New Jersey
W. W. Phelps (Mormon) (1792–1872), early convert and leader in the Latter Day Saint movement
M. William Phelps (born 1968), American crime writer and investigative journalist